Robert Holbrook Hopkins (March 22, 1902 – January 16, 1968) was an American attorney who worked for the firm of Gaston, Snow Motley & Holt and was Corporation Counsel for the city of Boston.

Early life
Hopkins was born on March 22, 1902, in Worcester, Massachusetts. His family moved to Newton, Massachusetts, when Hopkins was 12. He graduated from Newton High School, Harvard College (class of 1922), and Harvard Law School (class of 1925). He was coxswain on Harvard's crew and was a member of the Union Boat Club.

On September 7, 1929, he married Margaret Hitchcock Sims, daughter of Admiral William Sims. The couple resided on Beacon Hill and Brookline, Massachusetts, and had two children.

Legal career
Hopkins was admitted to the Massachusetts bar in 1926. From 1925 to 1931 he was associated with the firm of Gaston, Snow, Saltonstall and Hunt. He then practiced with Barker, Davison and Shattuck. He became a member of the firm in January 1934. In 1938 he became the first assistant corporation counsel for the city of Boston. He served under Henry Parkman Jr. and Robert Cutler. He also served as appeal agent for Draft Board 18, Ward 5. On July 28, 1942, Cutler resigned to join the United States Army and Hopkins succeeded him as corporation counsel. He resigned from the position on November 15, 1943, to join the procurement legal division in the office of the United States Under Secretary of the Navy. After the war, Hopkins was a member of the firm of Gaston, Snow Motley & Holt.

Other work
Hopkins was a Brookline town meeting member for many years. He also served on the executive committee of the Massachusetts Eye and Ear Infirmary and was a director of the South Boston Neighborhood House.

Hopkins died on January 16, 1968, in Boston.

References

1902 births
1968 deaths
Corporation counsels of Boston
Harvard Crimson rowers
Harvard Law School alumni
Massachusetts lawyers
People from Beacon Hill, Boston
People from Brookline, Massachusetts
People from Newton, Massachusetts
People from Worcester, Massachusetts
Harvard College alumni
20th-century American lawyers